One size fits all is a marketing term indicating the utility of an article. 

One Size Fits All may also refer to:
 One Size Fits All (Frank Zappa album), 1975 album by Frank Zappa and the Mothers of Invention
 One Size Fits All (Pink Cream 69 album), 1991 album by Pink Cream 69
 One Size Fits All, 1989 album by Ole Evenrud